Sorgu (Swedish: Sorkholm)   is a  uninhabited Estonian islet in the Gulf of Riga,  southeast of the island of Manilaid. Administratively Sorgu belongs to the Manija village in Tõstamaa Parish, Pärnu County.

The reefs of Sorgu were already mentioned on the Willem Janzoon Blaeu's 1662 Livonian map as Sorkholm. In 1904 a  brick lighthouse with outbuildings was built. Later in 1913 the complex was expanded to accommodate the lighthouse keeper's family. The lighthouse has been automated since the 1970s.

See also
List of islands of Estonia

References

Uninhabited islands of Estonia
Tõstamaa Parish
Estonian islands in the Baltic